Freimanis Glacier is a tributary glacier that flows west-northwest for  and enters Tucker Glacier between Mount Greene and Novasio Ridge, in the Admiralty Mountains of Antarctica. It was mapped by the United States Geological Survey from surveys and U.S. Navy air photos, 1960–62, and was named by the Advisory Committee on Antarctic Names for Harry Freimanis, an aurora scientist and station scientific leader at Hallett Station, 1962–63.

References

Glaciers of Victoria Land
Borchgrevink Coast